Rockbridgeite is an anhydrous phosphate mineral in the "Rockbridgeite" supergroup with the chemical formula Fe2+Fe3+4(PO4)3(OH)5.  
It was discovered at the since-shut-down Midvale Mine in Rockbridge County, Virginia, United States.  The researcher who first identified it, Clifford Frondel, named it in 1949 for its region of discovery, Rockbridge County.

Structure 
The stable form of rockbridgeite is orthorhombic 2/m2/m2/m, space group Bbmm. Face-sharing trimers in the structure share octahedron corners, forming chains of octahedra extending in the direction of the b-axis. Adjacent chains formed from two trimers and (PO4) groups extending along the direction of the a-axis, resulting in sheets parallel to (001). Each chain of octahedra is connected by a layer of tetrahedra extending along the direction of the a-axis.

Unit cell 
The unit cell parameters are a = 14 Å, b = 17 Å, and c = 5.2 Å, with 4 formula units per unit cell (Z = 4).
More accurate values are given by various sources as follows.

a = 13.783 Å, b = 16.805 Å, c = 5.172 Å, β = 100.313(1)°

Optical properties 
Rockbridgeite varies from green, to black, to brownish green, to reddish brown. It is subtranslucent, with a greenish gray streak and vitreous to dull luster.  The refractive indices are Nx = 1.875, Ny = 1.880, Nz = 1.897.

Physical properties 
Rockbridgeite shows perfect cleavage on {100}, distinct cleavage on {010}, and distinct cleavage on {001}. Rockbridgeite is a brittle mineral, with an uneven fracture, hardness 4.5 and specific gravity 3.40.  It is soluble in hydrochloric acid HCl, but not in nitric acid HNO3 or sulfuric acid H2SO4.

Environment 
Rockbridgeite primarily forms in igneous rocks when the primary iron and manganese phosphates in granite pegmatites undergo mineral alteration through redox reactions, resulting in these phosphates becoming oxidized and causing rockbridgeite to form. More rarely, rockbridgeite can also form in sedimentary rocks in association with limonite from iron ore deposits. Associated minerals include triphylite, hureaulite, barbosalite, roscherite, and limonite.

Localities 
The type locality is the since-shut-down Midvale Mine in Rockbridge County, Virginia, United States.  Other localities for rockbridgeite include sites in Brazil, Portugal, Bavaria, Saxony, South Australia, Namibia, Zimbabwe, and Morocco.
Type material is conserved for reference in Harvard University in Cambridge, Massachusetts, United States.

References

External links 
JMol: http://rruff.geo.arizona.edu/AMS/viewJmol.php?amcsd=0000198

Phosphate minerals
Orthorhombic minerals
Minerals in space group 63